was a  after Kenji and before Shōō. This period spanned the years from February 1278 through April 1288.

Change of era
 1278 : The new era name was created to mark an event or a number of events. The previous era ended and a new one commenced in Kenji 4.

Events of the Kōan era
 August 15, 1281 (Kōan 4, 7th day of the intercalary 7th month): Battle of Kōan -- The second Mongol invasion of Japan is foiled, as a large typhoon – famously called a kamikaze, or divine wind – destroys much of the combined Chinese and Korean fleet and forces, numbering over 140,000 men and 4,000 ships.
 November 27, 1287 (Kōan 10, 21st day of the 10th month): In the 14th year of Go-Uda-tennōs reign (後宇多天皇14年), the emperor abdicated; and the succession (‘‘senso’’) was received by his cousin. Shortly thereafter, Emperor Fushimi is said to have acceded to the throne (‘‘sokui’’).

See also
 Mongol invasions of Japan
 Battle of Bun'ei - the first invasion attempt by Kublai Khan, in 1274.

Notes

References
 Nussbaum, Louis-Frédéric and Käthe Roth. (2005).  Japan encyclopedia. Cambridge: Harvard University Press. ;  OCLC 58053128
 Titsingh, Isaac. (1834). Nihon Odai Ichiran; ou,  Annales des empereurs du Japon.  Paris: Royal Asiatic Society, Oriental Translation Fund of Great Britain and Ireland. OCLC 5850691
 Varley, H. Paul. (1980). A Chronicle of Gods and Sovereigns: Jinnō Shōtōki of Kitabatake Chikafusa. New York: Columbia University Press. ;  OCLC 6042764

External links
 National Diet Library, "The Japanese Calendar" -- historical overview plus illustrative images from library's collection

Japanese eras
1270s in Japan
1280s in Japan